During the 2006–07 German football season, Bayer 04 Leverkusen competed in the Bundesliga.

Season summary
Leverkusen repeated the previous season's fifth-placed finish, qualifying again for the UEFA Cup.

First-team squad
Squad at end of season

Left club during season

References

Notes

Bayer 04 Leverkusen seasons
Bayer 04 Leverkusen